Niederhof may refer to:
Niederhof, a community or hamlet of Bruck an der Großglocknerstraße, Austria
Niederhof, a suburb, hamlet, or other subdivision in Sankt Georgen im Lavanttal, Wolfsberg District, Austria
Niederhof, a village in Wiehl, Germany
Niederhof, a district of Waldbröl, Germany
Niederhof, a commune of the former Evangelical parish Działdowo, Poland
Niederhof, a German exonym for Bas-Hoste, Moselle, France